Frederick N. Land (May 8, 1925 – March 19, 1992) was a professional American football player. He was drafted in the 11th round of the 1948 NFL draft by the Detroit Lions, but instead played professionally in the All-America Football Conference (AAFC) for the San Francisco 49ers for one season, in 1948. He played in two games as a lineman for the 49ers that season. He attended Louisiana State University, where he played college football for the LSU Tigers football team. He was born in North Little Rock, Arkansas and attended Little Rock Central High School.

References

1925 births
1992 deaths
people from North Little Rock, Arkansas
Players of American football from Arkansas
American football tackles
American football guards
San Francisco 49ers players
LSU Tigers football players
Little Rock Central High School alumni